The 1966–67 Boston Bruins season was the Bruins' 43rd season in the NHL. Despite the debut of Bobby Orr, the Bruins finished in last place and did not qualify for the playoffs. It was the last time the team would miss the playoffs until 1997, as they would embark on a streak of 29 straight seasons in the playoffs the next season.

Offseason

NHL Draft

Regular season
 Bobby Orr made his NHL debut October 19, with an assist in a 6–2 win over Detroit.

Bobby Orr
In his first professional season—although missing nine games with a knee injury presaging such woes throughout his career—he won the Calder Memorial Trophy as the league's outstanding rookie and, while the perennially cellar-dwelling Bruins finished in last place that season, sparked a renaissance that propelled the Bruins to make the playoffs the following twenty-nine straight seasons. New York Rangers defenseman Harry Howell, the winner of the Norris Trophy as the league's best defenseman in Orr's rookie year, famously predicted that he was glad to win when he did, because "Orr will own this trophy from now on."

Season standings

Record vs. opponents

Schedule and results

Player statistics

Regular season
Scoring

Goaltending

Awards and records
 Bobby Orr, Calder Memorial Trophy
 Bobby Orr, NHL Second Team All-Star

References
 Bruins on Hockey Database

Boston Bruins seasons
Boston Bruins
Boston Bruins
Boston Bruins
Boston Bruins
1960s in Boston